Gerhardus Frederick Johannes Liebenberg (born 7 April 1972) is a South African cricketer who played in five Test matches and four One Day Internationals from 1995 to 1998. He was dropped from South Africa's Test squad, after poor performances during the tour to England in 1998.

References

1972 births
Living people
People from Upington
Afrikaner people
South African people of German descent
South African people of Dutch descent
South Africa Test cricketers
South Africa One Day International cricketers
South African cricketers
Knights cricketers
Free State cricketers
Griqualand West cricketers